Abu Nour bin Abi Qara al-Ifrani (1014–1058) was a Berber king of the Taifa of Ronda. He built the most important sites in Ronda.

Life
Abu Nour belonged to the Banu Ifran. The Banu Ifran were part of the Taifa of Malaga until the death of Yahya ibn Ali ibn Hammud al-Mu'tali.  After that Abu Nour established a new kingdom, the Taifa of Ronda in 1039.  Abu Nour established alliances with the surrounding tribes.  When  deposed his uncle, from the throne of the Taifa of Malaga in 1046, Abu Nour helped Idris regain the throne.

In 1053, Abbad II al-Mu'tadid invited Abu Nour along with Muhammad bin Noh al-Darimi of Morón and Abadoun bin Khazaroun of Arcos to Seville.  Al-Mu'tadid killed Muhammad and Abadoun and imprisoned Abu Nour. Abu Nour's son  succeeded him as king of Ronda until 1057, when al-Mu'tadid released Abu Nour.  Abu Nour returned to Ronda, put his son to death for misrule, and died shortly afterward, leaving the kingdom to his second son, .

Notes 

Ifranid dynasty
11th-century people from al-Andalus
11th-century monarchs in Africa
Berber rulers